Yves Gabias (December 8, 1920 – March 25, 2002) was a politician from Quebec, Canada.

Background

He was born on December 8, 1920 in Montreal and was a lawyer.  He was the father of Liberal MNA André Gabias.

Member of the legislature

He ran as a Union Nationale candidate in the district of Trois-Rivières in 1960 and won.  He was succeeding Maurice Duplessis who had died a year before.  He was re-elected in 1962 and 1966.

Member of the Cabinet

He was appointed to the Cabinet and served as Minister of Immigration under Premier Jean-Jacques Bertrand.

Retirement from Politics

Gabias resigned in 1969 to become judge in Trois-Rivières.  He died on March 22, 2002.

References

1920 births
2002 deaths
Politicians from Montreal
Union Nationale (Quebec) MNAs